Mármol Macael Club Deportivo was a Spanish football team based in Macael, Almería, in the autonomous community of Andalusia. Founded in 1952 under the name of Atlético Macael CF, it was dissolved in 2011.

Season to season

3 seasons in Segunda División B
17 seasons in Tercera División

External links
La Preferente team profile 
ArefePedia team profile 

Defunct football clubs in Andalusia
Association football clubs established in 1952
1952 establishments in Spain
Association football clubs disestablished in 2011
2011 disestablishments in Spain